Charles John Kemeys Tynte or Charles Kemeys-Tynte FRS (9 April 1800 — 16 September 1882) was an English Liberal politician who sat in the House of Commons in two periods between 1832 and 1865.

Tynte was the son of Charles Kemeys Kemeys-Tynte, and his wife Anne Leyson. He was Lieutenant-Colonel of the West Somerset Yeomanry and was appointed Colonel of the Royal Glamorgan Light Infantry militia on 4 January 1849. He commanded the regiment until his retirement in 1862. He was also elected a Fellow of the Royal Society in 1834.

At the 1832 general election, Tynte was elected Member of Parliament for West Somerset. He held the seat until 1837.  In 1847 he was elected MP for Bridgwater. He held the seat until 1865.

Tynte died at the age of 82.

Tynte married Elizabeth Swinnerton (daughter of Thomas Swinnerton) on 18 July 1820. He married again, to Vincentia Brabazon (daughter of Wallop Brabazon) on 15 Apr 1841 in Leamington Priors.

References

External links
 

1800 births
1882 deaths
West Somerset Yeomanry officers
Glamorgan Militia officers
Tynte
Liberal Party (UK) MPs for English constituencies
Whig (British political party) MPs for English constituencies
UK MPs 1832–1835
UK MPs 1835–1837
UK MPs 1847–1852
UK MPs 1852–1857
UK MPs 1857–1859
UK MPs 1859–1865